Events from the year 1727 in Scotland.

Incumbents 

 Secretary of State for Scotland: vacant

Law officers 
 Lord Advocate – Duncan Forbes
 Solicitor General for Scotland – John Sinclair, jointly with Charles Erskine

Judiciary 
 Lord President of the Court of Session – Lord North Berwick
 Lord Justice General – Lord Ilay
 Lord Justice Clerk – Lord Grange

Events 
 31 May – the Royal Bank of Scotland is founded by Royal Charter in Edinburgh. Co-founder Lord Ilay is its first governor.
 Board of Trustees for Fisheries, Manufactures and Improvements in Scotland established.
 An old woman known as Janet (Jenny) Horne of Loth, Sutherland, becomes the last alleged witch in the British Isles to be executed when she is burned at the stake in Dornoch. (Some sources give the date as June 1722.)
 Outbreak of smallpox on Hirta.
 The first Palladian villa in Scotland, Mavisbank House, designed by William Adam in collaboration with his client, Sir John Clerk of Penicuik, is completed.

Births 
 7 September – William Smith, Episcopalian priest and theologian, first provost of the University of Pennsylvania, poet and historian (died 1803 in the United States)
 Niel Gow, fiddler (died 1807)

Deaths 
 Elizabeth, Lady Wardlaw, ballad writer (born 1677)

See also 

 Timeline of Scottish history

References 

 
Years of the 18th century in Scotland
Scotland
1720s in Scotland